Handelsnytt (Swedish: News of Commerce) is a monthly trade union magazine based in Stockholm, Sweden.

History and profile
The magazine was established in 1907 with the title Handelsarbetaren (Swedish: Commercial Employee). The current title was adopted in 1951. The magazine was started in Malmö, but it was moved to Stockholm in 1999.

Handelsnytt is published eleven times a year and is the official media outlet of the Union of Commercial Employees. As of 2016 Anna Filipsson was the editor-in-chief. Handelsnytt covers articles concerning industry news from the perspective of employees. The magazine focuses on the topics such as health and safety, organization, equal opportunities and salaries.

In 2010 Handelsnytt had a circulation of 147,900 copies. It was 145,600 copies in 2011 and 146,800 copies in 2012. In 2015 the circulation rose to 155,100 copies.

See also
 List of magazines in Sweden

References

External links
 

1907 establishments in Sweden
Business magazines published in Sweden
Magazines established in 1907
Magazines published in Stockholm
Monthly magazines published in Sweden
Professional and trade magazines
Swedish-language magazines
Mass media in Malmö